Waxwing was a British solid rocket motor used for apogee kick as the 3rd (upper) stage of the Black Arrow satellite launch vehicles.
Waxwing was used to successfully place the Prospero X-3 satellite into low Earth orbit on 28 October 1971, Britain's only satellite launch on an indigenously developed launch vehicle.

Another use of Waxwing was to increase the velocity of test re-entry vehicles on Black Knight during tests for the Blue Streak missile.

Design and development
Design was by the Rocket Propulsion Establishment (RPE) at Westcott and it was manufactured by Bristol Aerojet. The casing was spherical and the propellant grain used an internal star profile to control the initial burn rate.

Specifications
Thrust: 29.4 kN
Specific impulse: 2700 m/s (278 s)
Burn time: 28 s  40 seconds
Weight:
Gross mass: 
Unfuelled mass: 
Dimensions:
Diameter: 
Overall length: 
Nozzle length: 
Nozzle diameter:

References

 Astronautix Page

Rocket engines of the United Kingdom
Rocket engines
Solid-fuel rockets